The Order of Rio Branco (Ordem de Rio Branco) is an honorific order of Brazil instituted by decree 51.697 of February 5, 1963. It is named in honor of the Brazilian diplomat José Paranhos, Baron of Rio Branco.

The President of Brazil serves as the Grand Master of the Order while the Minister of Foreign Affairs is the order's Chancellor.

Ranks
The order is composed of six ranks of merit :
 Grand Cross (unlimited)
 Grand Officer (60 members)
 Commander (50 members)
 Officer (40 members)
 Knight (30 members)
 Medal (unlimited)

Insignia 
The ribbon of the medal is blue with white borders.

Notable recipients 

 Grand Crosses
 Ban Ki-moon
 Maria Barroso
 Abdelouahed Belkeziz
 Prince Carl Philip, Duke of Värmland
 Olavo de Carvalho
 Pierre-François Forissier
 Frederik, Crown Prince of Denmark
 Édouard Guillaud
 Onno Hattinga van't Sant
 Princess Madeleine, Duchess of Hälsingland and Gästrikland
 Jean-Paul Paloméros
 Alfredo Pareja Diezcanseco
 Vasco Joaquim Rocha Vieira
 Sadao Watanabe
Mako Komuro, formerly Princess Mako of Akishino
 Grand Officers
 Benedito Antônio de lima
 Beatriz Consuelo
 Vicente Blanco Gaspar
 Duarte de Freitas do Amaral
 Commanders
 Laurindo Almeida
 Celso Antunes
 Silvio Barbato
 Gerard Béhague
 Luiz Bevilacqua
 António Costa
 Richard Descoings
 Gilbert Forray
 Graciano García García
 Gilberto Gil
 Mario Pavan
 Adnan Kassar
 Simona Miculescu
 Andrew Parsons (sports administrator)
 Riordan Roett
 Edmond Safra
 Toots Thielemans
 Álvaro de Vasconcelos
 Officer
 Cafu
Inversin Alexandru
Grzegorz Hajdarowicz
Maria da Conceição Tavares
 Knights
 Pelé
 Charlie Byrd
 Medal
 Unknown Class
 Renato Aragão
 Elizabeth Bishop
 Yeda Pessoa de Castro
 Alfredo Chiaradía
 Maria d'Apparecida
 Eli Whitney Debevoise II
 Tewolde Gebremariam
 Nahum Goldmann
 José Graziano da Silva
 Enrique V. Iglesias
 Ivan Izquierdo
 Álvaro Manzano
 Milinda Moragoda
 Airto Moreira
 Marlos Nobre
 Fayga Ostrower
 Flora Purim
 Ciro de Quadros
 Marcelo Sánchez Sorondo
 Edouard Saouma
 Mario Silva (politician)
 Peter Sutherland
 Vladimir Vasiliev (dancer)
 Inger Wikström

References

External links 
Decree nº51.697, de 5 february 1963
 Ministério das Relações Exteriore - Ordem de Rio Branco
Ministério das Relações Exteriore - Regulamento da Ordem de Rio Branco

Rio Branco
Rio Branco, Order of the
Awards established in 1963
1963 establishments in Brazil